Showplace is a 3D computer graphics program. It was released in the 1990s by Pixar with versions for Apple Macintosh and Microsoft Windows. The Mac version was co-developed by Phil Beffrey and Dana Batali. Version 1.0 sold for US$995. It would create a basic primate model, from which the user could change model surfaces and set lighting and camera angles. Version 2.0, which cost $495–695, provided additional modeling tools for users call Clip Objects Library and require Pixar's Renderman for render images. Users can import model from other software by use file RIB format.

Features
Version 1.0:
 42 Clip Object library
 Import objects using RIB format
 Requires 32 bit QuickDraw, math coprocessor
 LabelMaker utility for creating Looks
 4 kinds of lights (ambient, sun, point, spot light)
 Unlimited number of lights
 Background rendering
 Export TIFF and PICT images

Version 1.1

 Upgrade for Mac Quadra 700 and 900
 CD version ($695 US)

Version 2.0 features

 18 plugins for basic geometry shapes 
 Import Adobe Illustrator 3.0+ files, DXF files
 Create 3D type from outline fonts
 Lathe curves while creating 3D objects
 Glimpse 
 Professional Look browser
 3 node version of NetRenderMan
 MacRenderMan standard render

In 1992 Valis group create PrimeRIB object library and PickTure (345$ US) and 3 shader libraries (345$ US) for Showplace.

It was discontinued when Pixar chose to concentrate on film production instead of application development.

Universal Scene Description
Pixar's Universal Scene Description (USD) software tool included many Showplace features, such as importing models, creating basic primate models and applying transformations. Transformations include organizing, rotating and scaling models, adding lights, adjusting and changing lighting and changing model materials. USD is designed to work with the modern 3D animation pipeline. Unlike Showplace, Pixar uses USD to create 3D animated movies. USD uses an internal OpenGL renderer. Pixar released an open source version of Universal Scene Description on 2016-07-26.

References

3D graphics software
Pixar